On 26 August 2007, an Antonov  An-32B crashed at Kongolo Airport in Kongolo in the Democratic Republic of the Congo, killing 14 of the 15 people on board.

Accident 

Loaded with nine tons of cassiterite and other minerals and carrying 12 passengers and a crew of three, an Antonov An-32B operated by the Great Lakes Business Company took off from  Kongolo Airport for a domestic flight to Goma International Airport in Goma on 26 August 2007. About ten minutes after takeoff, the aircraft experienced engine trouble, and the crew – composed of two Ukrainians and a Russian – attempted to return to Kongolo Airport. On approach to Kongolo Airport about 3 kilometers (1.9 miles) short of the runway, the aircraft struck trees and crashed at about 16:00 local time. The wreckage caught fire. All three crew members and 11 of the 12 passengers died.

Aircraft 

The aircraft was a twin-engine Antonov An-32B (NATO reporting name "Curl"), manufacturer's serial number 14-07. It had first flown in 1987 and was registered as 9Q-CAC.

References

External links 

 

Airliner accidents and incidents caused by engine failure
Accidents and incidents involving the Antonov An-32
Aviation accidents and incidents in the Democratic Republic of the Congo
Aviation accidents and incidents in 2007